Elections were held in the Australian state of Queensland on 15 July 1995 to elect the 89 members of the state's Legislative Assembly.

The Labor Party, which had been in power since the 1989 election and led by Premier Wayne Goss, was elected to a third term, defeating the National/Liberal Coalition under Rob Borbidge.  The Queensland Nationals and Liberals were fighting their first election as a coalition in 15 years, having renewed it midway through Goss' second term.  The Coalition actually won a majority of the two-party preferred vote.  However, most of that vote was wasted on landslide margins in the Nationals' rural heartland.  As a result, while the Coalition scored an overall eight-seat swing, it only won nine seats in greater Brisbane, allowing Labor to hold on to power with a majority of one seat.

On 8 December 1995, the Court of Disputed Returns threw out the results in Mundingburra, which Labor's Ken Davies had won by 16 votes, after it was discovered that 22 overseas military personnel were denied the chance to vote.  This forced a by-election, held in February 1996. Liberal Frank Tanti won the by-election, resulting in a hung parliament.  With Labor and the Coalition holding 44 seats each, the balance of power rested with Liz Cunningham, the newly elected Independent member for Gladstone.  Cunningham threw her support to the Coalition, allowing Borbidge to form a minority government.

Key dates

Results

|}

Seats changing hands

Post-election pendulum

See also
 Candidates of the Queensland state election, 1995
 Members of the Queensland Legislative Assembly, 1992–1995
 Members of the Queensland Legislative Assembly, 1995–1998
 Goss Ministry

References

Elections in Queensland
Queensland state election
1990s in Queensland
Queensland state election